Alessia Gazzola (born 9 April 1982, Messina, Sicily, Italy) is an Italian novelist.

Gazzola is a medical examiner and she published her first novel, L'allieva, in 2011.  Her novels mix crime fiction and chick lit, the central character being Alice Allevi.

Her 2018 novel Il ladro gentiluomo won the 2019 Premio Bancarella.

Books

L'allieva novels 

 L'allieva (Longanesi 2011)
 Un segreto non è per sempre (Longanesi 2012)
 Sindrome da cuore in sospeso (Longanesi 2012)
 Le ossa della principessa (Longanesi 2014)
 Una lunga estate crudele (Longanesi, 2015)
 Un po' di follia di primavera (Longanesi 2016)
 Arabesque (Longanesi 2017)
 Il ladro gentiluomo (Longanesi, 2018)

Other novels 

 ‘No on è la fine del mondo'' (Longanesi 2016)

References

External links
 

1982 births
Living people
21st-century Italian writers
Italian crime fiction writers
Medical examiners
Italian women novelists
Italian medical writers
Chick lit writers
Writers from Messina
21st-century Italian women writers
Women crime fiction writers